Mbacké Department is one of the 45 departments of Senegal, and one of the three constituting the Diourbel Region.

The capital of the department is the only commune, Mbacké.

The rural districts (communautés rurales) are:
 Kael Arrondissement
 
 
 
 
 
 
 
 
 Ndame Arrondissement
 
 
 
 
 
 Taïf Arrondissement
 
 

Historic sites 
 Grand Mosque at Touba
 Aynou Rahmati, wells of the Miséricorde at Touba
 Gouye Tékhé and Gouye Ziarra baobab trees at Touba
 Négou Mame Diarra Bousso at Khourou Mbacké
 Tumulus field at Thiékène, Sous-Préfecture of Kael
 Tumulus at Gninguène.

See also
Touba

References

Departments of Senegal
Diourbel Region